Kirkhaugh is a railway station on the South Tynedale Railway, which runs between Slaggyford and Alston. The station serves the hamlet of Kirkhaugh in Northumberland.

History
The station opened in September 1999, as part of the South Tynedale Railway, a narrow-gauge heritage railway in Cumbria and Northumberland.

The station is located on the alignment of the former Alston Line, which ran from Haltwhistle to Alston, until the line's closure by the British Railways Board in May 1976. However, unlike stations at Alston and Slaggyford, Kirkhaugh was not part of the original line, instead being purpose-built for the heritage railway.

The opening of the extension from Gilderdale to Kirkhaugh saw the closure of the station at Gilderdale, after 13 years of service.

The line was later extended from Kirkhaugh to Lintley Halt in April 2012, and from Lintley Halt to Slaggyford in June 2018, reopening the station following a 42-year closure.

It is the eventual aim of the South Tynedale Railway for the narrow-gauge railway to serve the length of the former Alston Line, restoring the rail link between Haltwhistle and Alston.

See also
 Kirkhaugh
 South Tynedale Railway

References

External links
 

Railway stations in Great Britain opened in 1999
1999 establishments in England
Railway stations built for UK heritage railways